Nix v. Hedden, 149 U.S. 304 (1893), is a decision by the Supreme Court of the United States in which the Court held, 9–0, that the tomato should be classified as a vegetable rather than a fruit for purposes of tariffs, imports, and customs. Justice Horace Gray delivered the opinion of the Court in holding that the Tariff Act of 1883 used the ordinary meaning of the words "fruit" and "vegetable", instead of the technical botanical meaning.

Background of the case

John Nix founded the John Nix & Co. fruit commission in New York City in 1839. The company became one of the largest sellers of produce in New York City at the time, and was one of the first companies to ship produce from Virginia, Florida, and Bermuda to New York.

In 1883, President Chester A. Arthur signed the Tariff Act of March 3, 1883, requiring a tax to be paid on imported vegetables, but not fruit. The John Nix & Co. company filed a suit against Edward L. Hedden, Collector of the Port of New York, to recover back duties paid under protest. They argued against the tariff by pointing out that, botanically, a tomato is a fruit due to its seed-bearing structure growing from the flowering part of a plant.

At the trial, the plaintiffs' counsel entered into evidence definitions of the words "fruit" and "vegetables" from Webster's Dictionary, Worcester's Dictionary, and the Imperial Dictionary. They called two witnesses, who had been in the business of selling fruit and vegetables for 30 years, and asked them, after hearing these definitions, to say whether these words had "any special meaning in trade or commerce, different from those read".

During testimony, one witness testified that in regard to the dictionary definition:

Another witness testified that "I don't think the term 'fruit' or the term 'vegetables' had, in March 1883, and prior thereto, any special meaning in trade and commerce in this country different from that which I have read here from the dictionaries."

Both the plaintiffs' counsel and the defendant's counsel made use of the dictionaries. The plaintiffs' counsel read in evidence from the same dictionaries the definitions of the word tomato, while the defendant's counsel then read in evidence from Webster's Dictionary the definitions of the words pea, eggplant, cucumber, squash, and pepper. Countering this, the plaintiff then read in evidence from Webster's and Worcester's dictionaries the definitions of potato, turnip, parsnip, cauliflower, cabbage, carrot and bean.

The Court's decision

The court unanimously decided in favor of the respondent and found that the tomato should be classified under the customs regulations as a vegetable, based on the ways in which it is used, and the popular perception to this end. Justice Horace Gray, writing the opinion for the Court, stated that:

Justice Gray, citing several Supreme Court cases (Brown v. Piper, 91 U.S. 37, 42, and Jones v. U.S., 137 U.S. 202, 216) stated that when words have acquired no special meaning in trade or commerce, the ordinary meaning must be used by the court. In this case dictionaries cannot be admitted as evidence, but only as aids to the memory and understanding of the court. Gray acknowledged that botanically, tomatoes are classified as a "fruit of the vine"; nevertheless, they are seen as vegetables because they were usually eaten as a main course instead of being eaten as a dessert. In making his decision, Justice Gray mentioned another case where it had been claimed that beans were seeds — Justice Bradley, in Robertson v. Salomon, 130 U.S. 412, 414, similarly found that though a bean is botanically a seed, in common parlance a bean is seen as a vegetable. While on the subject, Gray clarified the status of the cucumber, squash, pea, and bean.

Subsequent jurisprudence
Nix has been cited in three Supreme Court decisions as a precedent for court interpretation of common meanings, especially dictionary definitions. (Sonn v. Maggone, ; Saltonstall v. Wiebusch & Hilger, ; and Cadwalader v. Zeh). Additionally, in JSG Trading Corp. v. Tray-Wrap, Inc., 917 F.2d 75 (2d Cir. 1990), a case unrelated to Nix aside from the shared focus on tomatoes, a judge wrote the following paragraph citing the case:

In 2005, supporters in the New Jersey legislature cited Nix as a basis for a bill designating the tomato as the official state vegetable.

See also

Carrot – defined to be a fruit in European Union law, for the purpose of jam classification; Annex III(A)(1), Council Directive 2001/113/EC of 20 December 2001 relating to fruit jams, jellies and marmalades and sweetened chestnut purée intended for human consumption 
 Ketchup as a vegetable
 Jaffa Cakes, the subject of a 1991 UK tribunal which decided that they were cakes, rather than biscuits (cookies), which would attract value-added tax.
Toy Biz v. United States – decided that action figures of certain superheroes are legally toys, not dolls
List of United States Supreme Court cases, volume 149

Notes

References

External links
 
Rocknel Fastener, Inc. v. United States – 34 page PDF covering a similar case hinging on the difference between screws and bolts. The difference is outlined in a 21-page PDF Distinguishing Bolts From Screws.

2
Tomatoes
United States statutory interpretation case law
United States Supreme Court cases
United States Supreme Court cases of the Fuller Court
1893 in United States case law